Boling is a census-designated place (CDP) in Wharton County, Texas, United States. This was a new CDP formed from parts of the Boling-Iago CDP prior to the 2010 census with a population of 1122.

Geography
Boling is located at  (29.258398, -95.943552).

References

Census-designated places in Wharton County, Texas
Census-designated places in Texas